Berbice High School is a school in New Amsterdam, Guyana.

Enrolment in 1966, the year control of the school was handed over to the Government, was 741.

References

External links
Aerial view

High schools and secondary schools in Guyana
History of Guyana
Educational institutions established in 1916
New Amsterdam, Guyana
1916 establishments in British Guiana